Coasta River may refer to the following rivers in Romania:

 Coasta, a tributary of the Lotru in Vâlcea County
 Coasta, a tributary of the Valea Caselor in Sibiu County
 Coasta Benghii River
 Coasta lui Rus, a tributary of the Jieț

See also 
 Coasta (disambiguation)
 Costești River